Guthrie McClintic (August 6, 1893 – October 29, 1961) was an American theatre director, film director, and producer based in New York.

Life and career
McClintic was born in Seattle, attended Washington University in St. Louis and New York's American Academy of Dramatic Arts, and became an actor, but soon became a stage manager and casting director for major Broadway producer Winthrop Ames. His Broadway directorial debut was on A. A. Milne's The Dover Road. McClintic's first major success was on The Barretts of Wimpole Street featuring his wife, the American actress Katharine Cornell, in 1931. He also directed Hamlet featuring John Gielgud in New York in 1936.

Katharine Cornell served on the Board of Directors of The Rehearsal Club, a place where young actresses could stay while looking for work in the theatre. McClintic sometimes found roles for the young women in his plays.

In what may have been lavender marriages, gay McClintic was married: firstly to actress Estelle Winwood, and then, for forty years, to actress Katharine Cornell - herself a lesbian. After they were married, they formed a production team M.C. & C Company, which produced plays for the rest of his life. He directed every play that Cornell starred in, including Romeo and Juliet, Candida, Antony and Cleopatra, No Time for Comedy, Antigone, Saint Joan, The Doctor's Dilemma, Three Sisters, and There Shall Be No Night, and The Constant Wife. Their production company brought over many of the leading Shakespearean actors of the day, giving them their first prominent Broadway roles, including John Gielgud, Ralph Richardson, Maurice Evans, and Laurence Olivier.

McClintic died of cancer on October 29, 1961, at his home in Sneden's Landing, New York. His widow retired from acting shortly after his death, her last role being in Jerome Kilty's dramatization of Dear Liar in 1961.

Theatre

The Dover Road (1921)
The Green Hat (1925)
The Letter (1927)The Barretts of Wimpole Street (1931)Alien Corn (1933)Romeo and Juliet (1934)The Old Maid (1935)Winterset (1935)Ethan Frome (1936)Saint Joan (1936)Hamlet (1936)Candida (1937)High Tor (1937)Key Largo (1939)No Time for Comedy (1939)The Doctor's Dilemma (1941)The Playboy of the Western World (1946)Dishonored Lady (1947)Antony and Cleopatra (1947)Medea (1949)Dear Liar (1960)

FilmsOn Your Back (1930)Once a Lady (1931)Once a Sinner'' (1931)

References

External links

Guthrie McClintic biography and films

1893 births
1961 deaths
American film directors
American theatre directors
Deaths from cancer in New York (state)
American gay men
LGBT theatre directors
LGBT people from Washington (state)
Artists from Seattle
Washington University in St. Louis alumni
American Academy of Dramatic Arts alumni